The 2017 NASCAR Xfinity Series was the 36th season of the Xfinity Series, a stock car racing series sanctioned by the NASCAR in the United States. The season began with the PowerShares QQQ 300 at Daytona International Speedway and ended with the Ford EcoBoost 300 at Homestead-Miami Speedway. Daniel Suárez was the defending drivers' champion while Toyota was the defending manufacturer's champion, although Suárez couldn't defend his title due to him racing in the Monster Energy NASCAR Cup Series.

During the season, races were broadcast by Fox Sports and NBC Sports for the third consecutive year.

William Byron of JR Motorsports won the driver's championship with a third-place finish in the season finale. Team Penske won the owner's championship while Chevrolet won the manufacturer's championship.

This was the second year that the Xfinity Series (and the Truck Series) had a playoff system. Two of the four "championship 4" drivers (who are shown below), were the same as last year's, the only differences being William Byron and Daniel Hemric were in it instead of Daniel Suárez and Erik Jones, who both moved up to the Cup Series full-time in 2017. Also, three of the four of them (Byron, Sadler, and Allgaier) all drove for JR Motorsports. As Hemric, the other driver in the "championship 4", drove for Richard Childress Racing, that meant that the "championship 4" was composed entirely of Chevrolet drivers. Also ironically, Sadler and Allgaier both ended up finishing in the same positions in the standings as they did in 2016, second and third, respectfully.

Teams and drivers

Complete schedule

Limited schedule

Notes

Changes

Teams
Stewart-Haas Racing fielded the No. 00 Ford Mustang for the 2017 season. Stewart-Haas Racing (as Haas CNC Racing) formerly competed in the Xfinity Series  from 2003 to 2006.
B. J. McLeod Motorsports fielded 3 full-time teams. The team previously fielded a 1 full-time team and 2 part-time teams.
Rick Ware Racing shut down its No. 25 team and move to the Monster Energy NASCAR Cup Series and the Camping World Truck Series. However, they returned at Road America.
Derrike Cope Racing announced on January 30 that it would shut down its No. 70 Chevrolet Camaro. Its owners' points were transferred to Stewart-Haas Racing.
Team Penske was originally planned to run a second full-time team for the season, but didn't due to sponsorship problems. The team once again started a part-time basis, that started at Las Vegas.
JGL Racing fielded 2 full-time teams. The team previously fielded 1 full-time team and 1 part-time team. However, at Chicagoland and Kentucky (fall) they entered only 1 team. On September 25, 2017, they announced that they would be releasing Dakoda Armstrong and would shut down the No. 28 Toyota Camry team effective immediately, due to a lack of funding. JGL also announced that they would focus their efforts on the No. 24 team for the remainder of the season.

Drivers
Cole Custer drove the No. 00 Ford Mustang for Stewart-Haas Racing full-time in 2017. Custer drove the No. 00 Chevrolet Silverado full-time for JR Motorsports in the Camping World Truck Series and part-time in the Xfinity series, driving the No. 5 and No. 88 Chevrolet Camaro in 2016. 
William Byron drove the No. 9 Chevrolet Camaro full-time for JR Motorsports in 2017. Byron drove the No. 9 Toyota Tundra for Kyle Busch Motorsports full-time in the Camping World Truck Series in 2016.
Daniel Hemric drove the No. 21 Chevrolet Camaro full-time for Richard Childress Racing in 2017. Hemric drove the No. 19 Ford F-150 for Brad Keselowski Racing in the Truck Series.
Michael Annett drove the No. 5 Chevrolet Camaro full-time for JR Motorsports in 2017. His sponsor from the last couple years in Xfinty and Cup Pilot Flying J came up with him. Annett drove the No. 46 Chevrolet SS for HScott Motorsports from 2015 to 2016.
Matt Tifft drove the No. 19 Toyota full-time for Joe Gibbs Racing in 2017, replacing Daniel Suarez who is moving to the Monster Energy Cup Series to drive for JGR. Tifft shared the No. 18 Toyota with Kyle Busch and other drivers in 2016.
Tyler Reddick joined Chip Ganassi Racing, sharing the No. 42 Chevrolet with Kyle Larson. Reddick drove for Brad Keselowski Racing in the Camping World Truck Series for the previous three seasons. On August 1, it was announced that Justin Marks, who had driven part-time for Ganassi in 2016, would be returning to the No. 42 for the 2 races at Mid-Ohio and Road America. On September 29, it was announced that Alex Bowman would drive the No. 42 for 2 races at Charlotte in October and Phoenix in November. In 2016, Bowman drove part-time, driving the No. 88 car for both Hendrick Motorsports in the Monster Energy NASCAR Cup Series and JR Motorsports in the Xfinity series and earlier in 2017 he drove 1 race in the No. 24 GMS Racing Chevrolet in the NASCAR Camping World Truck Series.
Spencer Gallagher moved up to the Xfinity Series full-time in 2017 with GMS Racing. Gallagher drove a partial Xfinity schedule and a full-time Truck schedule in 2015 and 2016.
Ryan Preece departed from JD Motorsports to return to the Whelen Modified Tour. On July 5, it was announced that Preece would return to the Xfinity Series to drive the No. 20 Toyota Camry for Joe Gibbs Racing for 2 races at New Hampshire and Iowa in July. On August 3, following Preece's win at Iowa, it was announced that JGR would add another race to Preece's slate with him running the No. 20 at Kentucky in September. Preece also drove the No. 18 car for JGR at Homestead in November.
Kevin Harvick drove the No. 41 Ford Mustang for Stewart-Haas Racing in 6 races with sponsorship from Bad Boy Buggies for Atlanta, Hunt Brothers Pizza for other 4 races and FIELDS Inc. for Watkins Glen. Harvick drove the No. 88 car last year for JR Motorsports.
Jeff Green drove the No. 8 Chevrolet Camaro full-time for B. J. McLeod Motorsports. Green had previously start and parked for TriStar Motorsports and ran 3 races with B. J. in the No. 99 car. After failing to qualify at Charlotte Green was released from the team. Green now start and parks for RSS Racing. However, he returned to the No. 8 for Daytona.
Casey Mears drove the No. 98 Ford Mustang in 12 races for Biagi-DenBeste Racing. His last race in this series was in 2010. Mears also replaced the injured Aric Almirola at Pocono and Daytona increasing his races to 14.
Ty Majeski made his first Xfinity Series start at Iowa in June in the No. 60 car for Roush Fenway Racing and drove at Iowa in July. On November 9, 2017, it was announced that Majeski would run the No. 60 Ford Mustang in the season finale at Homestead-Miami.
Scott Lagasse Jr. drove the No. 3 Chevrolet Camaro for Richard Childress Racing at Iowa in June, Road America, Mid-Ohio, and Homestead sharing the ride with Ty Dillon, who drove the car for 27 races. On July 3, it was announced that Brian Scott would come out of retirement to drive the car at Iowa in July and Kentucky in September. Scott had previously competed for RCR in the Xfinity Series from 2013–2015. In 2016, Scott drove the No. 44 Richard Petty Motorsports Ford Fusion in the Monster Energy NASCAR Cup Series before retiring at the end of the season.
Kyle Benjamin drove the No. 18 Toyota Camry and the No. 20 Toyota Camry for 5 races for Joe Gibbs Racing. Benjamin drove the No. 20 at Richmond in April and Pocono. He drove the No. 18 at both of the Iowa races and Kentucky in September.
Ben Kennedy drove the No. 2 Chevrolet Camaro for Richard Childress Racing for 9 races beginning with Talladega in May, sharing the ride with Austin Dillon and Paul Menard. On April 17, it was announced that Kennedy would also drive the No. 96 Chevrolet Camaro for GMS Racing for 12 races beginning at Charlotte in May. However, the No. 96 skipped some scheduled races such as Pocono in June, Richmond, Chicagoland, and Dover in September, and Charlotte in October. The reason is mainly they didn't have sponsorship for the race.
Christopher Bell drove the No. 18 Toyota Camry and the No. 20 Toyota Camry for 7 races for Joe Gibbs Racing. Bell drove the No. 18 at Charlotte in May, and the fall races at Kansas, Texas, and Phoenix. He drove the  No. 20 at Iowa in June, Richmond in September, and Homestead in November. On August 5, it was announced that Bell would run another race in the No. 18 at Road America in August. Bell currently competes full-time in the NASCAR Camping World Truck Series, driving the No. 4 Toyota Tundra for Kyle Busch Motorsports.
Cale Conley returned to NASCAR for one-race deal at Charlotte after almost 3 years absence.
On June 5, it was announced that after the race at Pocono, the No. 6 Roush Fenway Racing Ford Mustang team would be shut down. Bubba Wallace moved over to the Monster Energy NASCAR Cup Series to drive the No. 43 Richard Petty Motorsports Ford Fusion, filling in for the injured Aric Almirola. Wallace returned to the Xfinity Series in September at Chicagoland, driving the No. 98 Ford Mustang for Biagi-DenBeste Racing.
Sam Hornish Jr. drove the No. 22 Ford Mustang for Team Penske for 3 races with the possibility of more races being added. Hornish drove the No. 22 at both Iowa races as well as at Mid-Ohio. Hornish had previously competed for Team Penske in the Monster Energy NASCAR Cup Series from 2008–2010 and in the Xfinity Series from 2011–2013. In 2016, Hornish drove part-time in the Xfinity Series driving the No. 18 Toyota Camry for Joe Gibbs Racing and the No. 2 Chevrolet Camaro for Richard Childress Racing. After his win at Mid-Ohio, Hornish returned to No. 22 at Kentucky (fall). Hornish also drove the No. 12 car at Charlotte in the fall, and the No. 22 car at Homestead in November.
Angela Ruch-Cope returned to NASCAR at Kentucky after almost 5 years hiatus.
Brett Moffitt drove the No. 96 Chevrolet Camaro for GMS Racing at the July Iowa Race. Moffitt has only 1 Xfinity Start back in 2012 driving the No. 99 Toyota Camry for RAB Racing, finishing 9th in the July Iowa Race. Earlier this season, Moffitt had planned to run the full NASCAR Camping World Truck Series schedule, driving the No. 7 Toyota Tundra for Red Horse Racing, before the team shut down in late May.
P. J. Jones returned to NASCAR at Watkins Glen. His last race in NASCAR was in 2011. Enrique Baca, Brian Henderson, Devin Jones and Stephen Young all of them made their Xfinity Series debut at Watkins Glen.
 On August 5, it was announced that Regan Smith drove the No. 18 Toyota Camry for Joe Gibbs Racing at the Mid-Ohio Sports Car Course in August. Smith currently competes part-time in the NASCAR Camping World Truck Series, driving the No. 92 Ford F-150 for RBR Racing and also made a few starts in the Monster Energy NASCAR Cup Series, subbing for Aric Almirola in the No. 43 Ford Fusion for Richard Petty Motorsports. In 2016, Smith drove full-time in Cup, driving the No. 7 Chevrolet Camaro for Tommy Baldwin Racing, and also made a few starts in the Xfinity series, driving the No. 88 Chevrolet Camaro for JR Motorsports.
 On August 8, it was announced that Open Wheel and Sports Car driver James Davison, would be driving the No. 20 Joe Gibbs Racing Toyota Camry for 2 races, at Mid-Ohio and Road America. Davison previously made 1 start in the Xfinity series in 2016, driving the No. 90 King Autosport Chevrolet Camaro to a 19th-place finish at Road America. Earlier this year, Davison replaced an injured Sébastien Bourdais in the Indianapolis 500, finishing 20th.
Matt Bell returned to NASCAR at Mid-Ohio. His last race in NASCAR was in 2012. Earlier this year, he compete in the 24 Hours of Daytona. Sheldon Creed made his Xfinity Series debut at Mid-Ohio.
 On August 19, it was announced that Austin Cindric would be making his NASCAR Xfinity Series debut driving the No. 22 Ford Mustang for Team Penske at Road America. Cindric currently competes full-time in the Camping World Truck Series driving the No. 19 Ford F-150 for Brad Keselowski Racing.
John Graham returned to NASCAR at Road America. His last race in NASCAR was in 2007.
 On September 25, 2017, JGL Racing announced that they would releasing Dakoda Armstrong and that they would be shutting down the No. 28 Toyota Camry race team immediately due to a lack of funding.

Crew chiefs
Matt Beckman served as crew chief of the car driven by Matt Tifft in 2017. Beckman was an engineer of the No. 11 Cup team in 2016.
Jeff Meendering arrived as crew chief of the No. 00 car driven by Cole Custer in 2017. Meendering was the car chief of the No. 20 car driven by Matt Kenseth for the Cup Series in 2016.
Matt Swiderski served as crew chief for Ty Dillon in 2017. Swiderski was the head of vehicle development in 2016.
Scott Graves served as crew chief for Kyle Busch and others in the No. 18 in 2017 as announced January 26. Graves was the No. 19 crew chief for Daniel Suarez in 2016.
On May 22, it was announced that Justin Alexander, crew chief for the Richard Childress Racing No. 2 team, would be moving up to be the crew chief of the No. 3 team driven by Austin Dillon in the Monster Energy NASCAR Cup Series, replacing former crew chief Slugger Labbe who left the team to pursue other opportunities. Randall Burnett, who previously was the crew chief for A. J. Allmendinger in the Cup Series for JTG Daugherty Racing, replaced Alexander.

Manufacturers
B. J. McLeod Motorsports switched from Ford to Chevrolet. Before the race at Talladega, they switched to Toyota for superspeedways races, except for no. 99 for David Starr which he used his Chevrolet.

Rule changes
On October 26, NASCAR announced that drivers with more than five years of full-time racing on the Cup level may drive a maximum of 10 Xfinity Series races. They are also ineligible to drive in the Xfinity Dash4Cash races as well as the final eight races of the season. Exceptions were be given to drivers with more than five years of full-time racing on the Cup level if they declared to run points in Xfinity Series.
On February 8, 2017, NASCAR announced a new damaged vehicle policy for all three national series. Body panels can no longer be replaced after a wreck, and a team has five minutes on pit road to fix the damage before they are eliminated.
Like the NASCAR Cup Series, all Xfinity Series races were split into three segments. Top 10 drivers in the first two segments were awarded points. The final stage awarded   full points as usual. The first segment finish was about a quarter of the full distance, and the second segment finish was about half of the full distance.
All races except Indianapolis saw the rear spoiler size significantly reduced to reduce downforce. The Indianapolis race featured a restrictor plate package including front air ducts provided by NASCAR that could not be covered with tape and a return to the 2016 rear spoiler.

Schedule

The initial schedule, comprising 33 races, was released on May 5, 2016. A final schedule with some modifications made in conjunction with broadcast partners Fox and NBC was released on July 27, 2016.

Changes from 2016 include:

 The May Dover race moved to June, after the Charlotte race weekend.
 The June Iowa race moved from a Sunday afternoon to a Saturday night.
 The July Iowa race moved from night to mid-afternoon.
 Road America moved from a Saturday afternoon to a Sunday afternoon.
 The playoff race at Texas Motor Speedway moved from a Saturday afternoon to a Saturday night.
 The playoff race at Phoenix International Raceway moved back to a Saturday afternoon. It was a night race in 2016.
 The October Charlotte race was originally scheduled for Friday night. But on April 20, NASCAR moved the race to Saturday afternoon.
The Fox and NBC broadcast networks aired four races each, where the rest aired on pay channels FS1 and NBCSN.

The Coca-Cola Firecracker 250 started on June 30 but the rest of the race was postponed to July 1 due to persistent rain.
 The Alsco 300 was postponed from July 7 to July 8 because of inclement weather.

Results and standings

Race results

Drivers' Championship

(key) Bold – Pole position awarded by time. Italics – Pole position set by final practice results or owner's points. * – Most laps led. 1 – Stage 1 winner. 2 – Stage 2 winner. 1–10 – Regular season top 10 finishers.
. – Eliminated after Round of 12
. – Eliminated after Round of 8

Owners' championship (Top 15)
(key) Bold - Pole position awarded by time. Italics - Pole position set by final practice results or rainout. * – Most laps led. 1 – Stage 1 winner. 2 – Stage 2 winner. 1–10 – Owners' regular season top 10 finishers.
. – Eliminated after Round of 12
. – Eliminated after Round of 8

Manufacturers' Championship

See also

2017 Monster Energy NASCAR Cup Series
2017 NASCAR Camping World Truck Series
2017 NASCAR K&N Pro Series East
2017 NASCAR K&N Pro Series West
2017 NASCAR Whelen Modified Tour
2017 NASCAR Pinty's Series
2017 NASCAR PEAK Mexico Series
2017 NASCAR Whelen Euro Series

References

NASCAR Xfinity Series seasons